Gerald Clarke may refer to:

 Gerald Clarke (author), American biographer
 Gerald Clarke (artist), Cahuillia sculptor and artist from California
 Gerald B. Clarke, Rhodesian politician

See also
 Gerry Clark (1927–1999), New Zealand sailor and ornithologist
 Jeremy Clark (born 1982), American football player
 Jeremy Clarke (disambiguation)